Valeria Juan Ogden (February 9, 1924 – April 9, 2014) was an American politician, management consultant, and educator.

Born in Okanogan, Washington, Ogden received her bachelor's degree in sociology from Washington State University. She worked as a non-profit management consultant and adjunct professor at Lewis & Clark College and Portland State University. Ogden served in the Washington House of Representatives from 1991 until 2003 as a Democrat and served as Speaker Pro Tempore. She served six terms as State Representative. Ogden died of cancer in 2014.

She married Dan Ogden in 1946. They met while attending Washington State University in Pullman, Washington. The couple had three children, Jan, Patti, and Dan.

During her 12 years as State Representative, Ogden fought for state-run schools for the blind and deaf. Ogden pushed to improve standards of students learning braille and instructors teaching braille at the Washington State School for the Blind. Proud graduates of Washington State University, Val and Dan helped to bring the branch campus to Vancouver. The Washington State University Vancouver campus was established in 1989. The entire Ogden family is deeply rooted in Washington State University; Val, Dan, two of their children, and two of their grandchildren have received degrees.

She served as executive director of YWCA Clark County from 1985 to 1989. While serving as State Representative, she directed $300,000 of funds for the YWCA's capital campaign.

She was involved in the non-profit Camp Fire USA, doing national consulting for Camp Fire Girls. Ogden was an expert in non-profits and was often consulted for help when Camp Fire and other agencies needed help.

Ogden was active with several civic groups, including the Council on the Homeless, Human Services Council, the Clark County Mental Health Board, and Southwest Washington Center for the Arts.

In 2006, she received Clark County's First Citizen award.

References

1924 births
2014 deaths
People from Okanogan, Washington
Washington State University alumni
Lewis & Clark College faculty
Portland State University faculty
Businesspeople from Washington (state)
Women state legislators in Washington (state)
Democratic Party members of the Washington House of Representatives
20th-century American businesspeople
20th-century American women
American women academics
21st-century American women